Western High School is a High school located in Davie, Florida, serving students in grades 9 through 12. The school, which opened in 1981, is a part of the Broward County Public Schools district.

The principal is Jimmy Arrojo. The school's mascot is the Wildcat, and the official colors are Black and Vegas Gold. Western High received a Florida Department of Education school grade of "A" for the 2019 academic year.

Its attendance boundary includes: most of Davie,  and portions of Sunrise, and Weston.

Demographics 
As of the 2021-22 school year, the total student enrollment was 3,592. The ethnic makeup of the school was 82.6% White, 9.1% Black, 4.9% Hispanic, 4.1% Asian, 3.4% Multiracial, 0.5% Native American or Native Alaskan, and 0.3% Native Hawaiian or Pacific Islander.

Athletics 
The school offers athletic programs in football, cheerleading, basketball, tennis, soccer, color guard, swimming, water polo, golf, wrestling, baseball, softball, track & field, cross country, marching band, and volleyball.  In the Fall of 2002, the school's first state championship title was earned by the women's golf team. The Lady Wildcats were undefeated that year as well.

Arts 
The Western High School band program includes concert band, the Pride of the Wildcats marching band (formerly the Western Star Regiment), color guard, winter guard, and an indoor percussion program.

The chorus program offers three levels of vocal ensembles: Beginner's Chorus, Women's Choir, and Western Singers, the elite course offered to veterans of the program.

Notable alumni 
 Leslie Grace, recording artist
 Jacob Jeffries (Groten), recording artist
 Ryan Sadowski, professional baseball player (San Francisco Giants)
 Jon Feliciano, professional football player (New York Giants)
 Fabian Moreau, professional football player (Atlanta Falcons)

References 

Broward County Public Schools
High schools in Broward County, Florida
Public high schools in Florida
Davie, Florida
Educational institutions established in 1981
1981 establishments in Florida